SeaGen was the world's first large scale commercial tidal stream generator. It was four times more powerful than any other tidal stream generator in the world at the time of installation. It was successfully decommissioned by SIMEC Atlantis Energy Limited in summer 2019, having exported 11.6GWh to the grid since 2008. 

The first SeaGen generator was installed in Strangford Narrows between Strangford and Portaferry in Northern Ireland. Strangford Lough was also the site of the first known tide mill in the world, the Nendrum Monastery mill where remains dating from 787 have been excavated.

History

Marine Current Turbines, the developer of SeaGen, demonstrated first prototype of tidal stream generator in 1994 with a 15 kilowatt system in Loch Linnhe, off the west coast of Scotland. In May 2003, the prototype for SeaGen, '', was installed off the coast of Lynmouth, North Devon, England. Seaflow was a single rotor turbine which generated 300 kW but was not connected to the grid. SeaFlow was the world's first offshore tidal generator, and remained the world's largest until SeaGen was installed.

The first SeaGen generator was installed in Strangford Narrows between Strangford and Portaferry in Northern Ireland, in April 2008 and was connected to the grid in July 2008. It generated 1.2 MW for between 18 and 20 hours a day while the tides are forced in and out of Strangford Lough through the Narrows.

During the commissioning of the system a software error caused the blades of one of the turbines to be damaged. This left the turbine operating at half power until autumn 2008. Full power operation was finally achieved on 18 December 2008.

The system was removed in stages between 2016 and 2019, after Siemens sold the company and technology to rival Atlantis Resources (now SIMEC Atlantis Energy) in 2015.

Technology
It consists of twin axial-flow rotors, each driving a generator through a gearbox like a hydro-electric or wind turbine. These turbines have a patented feature by which the rotor blades can be pitched through 180 degrees allowing them to operate in both flow directions – on ebb and flood tides. The company claims a capacity factor of 0.59 (average of the last 2000 hours). The SeaGen was built at Belfast's Harland and Wolff's shipyards.

Environmental impact

SeaGen has been licensed to operate over a period of 5 years, during which there will be a comprehensive environmental monitoring programme to determine the precise impact on the marine environment.

References

External links

Marine Current Turbines Ltd.

Tidal stream generators
Tidal power stations in Northern Ireland
Scottish inventions